Dušan Mihajlović may refer to:

Dušan Mihajlović (footballer) (born 1985), Serbian football player
Dušan Mihajlović (politician) (born 1948), Serbian politician